Angelo Benedetto Rovegno Agama (born 28 May 1999) is a Peruvian footballer who plays as a centre-back.

Club career

Alianza Lima
Rovegno is a product of Alianza Lima and was promoted to the club's reserve team in 2017. On 28 November 2017 it was confirmed, that Rovegno had signed his first professional contract with Alianza and would be promoted to the first team squad for the 2018 season.

In January 2019, Rovegno went on a trial at Alianza Universidad and indicated, that he wanted to leave Alianza due to lack of opportunities on the first team. However, he ended up joining the club only on a loan deal for the 2019 season. He made a total of 11 appearances for Alianza Universidad. Rovegno returned to Alianza for the 2020 season and continued to play for the club's reserve team.

On 16 September 2020, Rovegno moved to Santos de Nasca on a deal for the rest of 2020. He made five appearances for the club in 2020. He continued at the club in 2021. He left at the end of the year.

References

External links
 
 

Living people
1999 births
Association football defenders
Peruvian footballers
Peruvian Primera División players
Peruvian Segunda División players
Club Alianza Lima footballers
Alianza Universidad footballers
Santos de Nasca players
Footballers from Lima